The 1977–78 season was the second time Tennis Borussia Berlin played in the 2. Bundesliga, the second highest tier of the German football league system. After 38 league games, Tennis Borussia finished 10th in the division. The club reached the second round of the DFB-Pokal; losing 3–1 at home to SC Westfalia Herne. Heinz-Josef Kehr scored 18 of the club's 58 league goals.

1977–78 Tennis Borussia Berlin squad

1977–78 fixtures

Player statistics

Final league position – 10th

References

External links 
 1977–78 Tennis Borussia Berlin season – squad and statistics at fussballdaten.de 

Tennis Borussia Berlin seasons
German football clubs 1977–78 season